Niklas Sigvardsson (born 1991) is a Swedish politician. He was elected as Member of the Riksdag in September 2022. He represents the constituency of Jönköping County. He is affiliated with the Social Democrats.

References 

Living people
1991 births
Place of birth missing (living people)
21st-century Swedish politicians
Members of the Riksdag 2022–2026
Members of the Riksdag from the Social Democrats